Stam1na (pronounced ) is a Finnish heavy metal musical group native of Lemi, South Karelia. Their music is arguably best described as thrash metal with some progressive metal, death, alternative and punk influences, and is sung in the Finnish language. The band mainly uses seven-string guitars on all albums except the first one where they used six-strings, and a few songs were composed for eight string guitar on the eighth album Taival.

Name
The band chose to use a '1' in their name to represent the 'I' in the word 'Stamina' to make them more distinct, primarily making the band easier to find in search engines.

Background
The band originally started as a three-piece in 1996, but it was only after several demo recordings that they got signed late in 2004 by Sakara Records, a label founded and headed by the fellow South Karelian band Mokoma.

The founding trio are Antti Hyyrynen on vocals and guitar, Pekka Olkkonen on lead guitar and Teppo Velin on drums. Bassist Kai-Pekka Kangasmäki was added to the lineup in 2005, and keyboardist Emil Lähteenmäki joined in 2009.

Stam1na's self-titled debut album, released on 2 March 2005, reached No. 13 on the Finnish album charts. Their second album, Uudet kymmenen käskyä, was released on 10 May 2006 and did even better on the charts, reaching No. 3 on its first week.

Claiming critical acclaim by heavy touring and winning several awards in Finland, and making their debut in Germany by touring with Apocalyptica in the autumn of 2007, they proceeded to release their third album Raja in February, 2008, which went straight to No. 1 on the Finnish album chart in the first week. 10 February 2010, Stam1na released their fourth album titled Viimeinen Atlantis, which translates as "The Last Atlantis", which also went straight to first place on the Finnish album chart, topping among others HIM's new release, and was certified gold by ÄKT in its first week of sales.

In 2012 Stam1na released their fifth album entitled Nocebo, produced by Joe Barresi. Nocebo topped the Finnish album chart and was certified gold on the day of its release. Their sixth album, SLK, was released in February 2014. Stam1na made a historical series of performances in summer 2015 by playing the Provinssirock festival on four consecutive days, playing a different album from their discography in its entirety on each day.

Their seventh studio album Elokuutio was released on 16 March 2016. Since then, they have been gradually touring outside of Finland, appearing on the 70,000 Tons of Metal cruise in 2017 and as part of the "Arctic Circle Alliance" with Skálmöld and Omnium Gatherum (2017-2018).

Stam1na released their eighth studio album Taival in 2018.

Lineup

Discography

Albums 

Compilation albums

Singles 

Joint singles Mokoma / Rytmihäiriö / Stam1na
2007: Sakara Tour 2006 Nosturi (FIN #7)
2007: Sakara Tour 2006 Työnkulma (FIN #8)
2007: Sakara Tour 2006 Rytmikorjaamo (FIN #9)
2007: Sakara Tour 2006 Tivoli (FIN #11)
2007: Sakara Tour 2006 Teatria (FIN #12)
2007: Sakara Tour 2006 Lutakko (FIN #14)
2007: Sakara Tour 2006 Sibeliustalo (FIN #16)

Music videos 
 Erilaisen rakkauden todistaja (Witness of a Different Kind of Love) (2003)
 Kadonneet kolme sanaa (The Lost Three Words) (2005)
 Ristiriita (Conflict/Cross Argument) (2005)
 Paha arkkitehti (An Evil Architect) (2005)
 Edessäni (In Front of Me) (2006)
 Likainen parketti (Dirty Parquet) (2006)
 Lääke (Medicine) (2008)
 Muistipalapelit (Memorypuzzles) (2008)
 Pakkolasku (Emergency landing/A Must-pay Bill) (2010)
 Rikkipää (Sulfur Head / Brokenhead) (2010)
 Yhdeksän tien päät (The Ends of Nine Roads) (2010)
 Valtiaan uudet vaateet (Ruler's New Demands) (2012)
 Puolikas ihminen (Half a Man) (2012)
 Panzerfaust (Iron Fist) (2014)
 Kuoliaaksi ruoskitut hevoset (Flogging Dead Horses) (2014)
 Vapaa on sana (Free Is a Word) (2014)
 Kuudet raamit (Six Frames) (2016)
 Elokuutio (Eloquence/The Living Cube) (2016)
 Enkelinmurskain (Angelcrusher) (2018)
 Kannoin sinut läpi hiljaisen huoneen (I Carried You Through a Silent Room) (2020)
 Memento Mori (ateistin kiitos) (parentheses: an atheist's commendation) (2021)

DVDs 
 Sakara Tour 2006 (2007)
 K13V (2009)

References

External links 

 Official site
 Sakara Records
 Stam1na at Myspace.com

Finnish heavy metal musical groups
Finnish thrash metal musical groups
Musical groups established in 1996
MTV Europe Music Award winners